Martynas Goštautas ( or Marcin Gasztołdowicz; ; 1428, Vilnius – c. 1483, Vilnius) was a nobleman from the Grand Duchy of Lithuania of the Goštautai family. He was the Grand Marshal of Lithuania, Voivode of Navahrudak (1464–1471), first Voivode of Kiev (1471–1475) and Voivode of Trakai (1480–1483). He was a servant to King Casimir IV Jagiellon, and was a founder of Tykocin monastery and the Dominican monastery and church in Trakai.

Residents of Kiev resented the appointment of a Roman Catholic as voivode and refused to let him in. In exchange, Kiev acquired the status of a voivodeship, equal to that of Trakai and Vilnius and the subsequent voivodes were Orthodox nobles.

Martynas was a son of Jonas Goštautas, carrying his first name as a patronymic, and father of Albertas Goštautas.

References

1428 births
1480s deaths

Year of death uncertain
Politicians from Vilnius
Clan Abdank
Ruthenian nobility
Martynas
15th-century Lithuanian people
Grand Marshals of the Grand Duchy of Lithuania
Voivodes of Trakai